Mount Chubukulakh, is a mountain in the Middle Kolyma District, Sakha Republic (Yakutia), Russia. At  it is the highest summit in the Yukaghir Highlands, a mountainous area of moderate height part of the East Siberian System. 

Mount Chubukulakh is located in the Chubukulakh Range, in the central part of the Yukaghir Highlands, a desolate area of the eastern limits of Yakutia, close to the border with Magadan Oblast.

See also
List of mountains and hills of Russia

References

Mountains of the Sakha Republic